The Cenobite Rocks are a small isolated group of rocks lying  northwest of Cape Adriasola, off the southwest coast of Adelaide Island. The group was so named by the UK Antarctic Place-Names Committee in 1963 because of its isolated position.

References 

Rock formations of Adelaide Island